The Basketball Champions League Star Lineup is an annual award for the Basketball Champions League (BCL)'s top ten basketball players for each season. The award is given by FIBA. The award began in conjunction with the league's inaugural season, the 2016–17 Basketball Champions League.

Voting criteria
The Star Lineup is chosen by a vote of the fans online, a vote of media journalists and representatives, and a vote of all of the head coaches of all of the teams in each season of the league. The fans, the media, and the league's head coaches each get 1/3 of the vote distribution.

Star Lineup by season

Player nationalities by national team:

See also
Basketball Champions League MVP
Basketball Champions League Final Four MVP
Basketball Champions League Top Scorer
Basketball Champions League Best Young Player
Basketball Champions League Game Day MVP

References

External links
Basketball Champions League (official website)
FIBA (official website)

Basketball Champions League awards and honors